Sahastata is a genus of crevice weavers that was first described by Pierre L.G. Benoit in 1968.

Species
 it contains 10 species:
Sahastata amethystina Marusik & Zamani, 2016 – Iran
Sahastata aravaensis (Ganem, Magalhaes, Zonstein & Gavish-Regev, 2022) – Israel, Jordan
Sahastata ashapuriae Patel, 1978 – India
Sahastata bosmansi Zonstein & Marusik, 2019 – Algeria
Sahastata infuscata (Kulczyński, 1901) – Eritrea
Sahastata nigra (Simon, 1897) (type) – Mediterranean to India
Sahastata sabaea Brignoli, 1982 – Yemen
Sahastata sinuspersica Marusik, Zamani & Mirshamsi, 2014 – Iran
Sahastata wesolowskae Magalhaes, Stockmann, Marusik & Zonstein, 2020 – Oman
Sahastata wunderlichi Magalhaes, Stockmann, Marusik & Zonstein, 2020 – Morocco

References

Araneomorphae genera
Filistatidae
Spiders of Asia